Gaolong Town is an urban town in Chaling County, Hunan Province, People's Republic of China.

Cityscape
The town is divided into 17 villages and 1 community, the following areas: Gaolong Community, Guangming Village, Xinggao Village, Shichuang Village, Lishi Village, Songjiang Village, Guangquan Village, Longji Village, Xingfeng Village, Gucheng Village, Zhuangtian Village, Renyuan Village, Shichong Village, Madu Village, Bailong Village, Shuitou Village, Changxing Village, and Jiudu Village.

References

External links

Divisions of Chaling County